Electronic Data Systems (EDS) was an American multinational information technology equipment and services company headquartered in Plano, Texas, which was founded in 1962 by Ross Perot. The company was a subsidiary of General Motors from 1984 until it was spun off in 1996. EDS was acquired by Hewlett-Packard in 2008.

History 

Electronic Data Systems (EDS) was founded in 1962 by H. Ross Perot, a graduate of the United States Naval Academy and a successful IBM salesman who first-hand observed how inefficiently IBM's customers typically were using their expensive systems.  Somewhat to IBM's chagrin, since the company wanted to sell as many computers as possible, Perot made a fortune changing this.  An early success was in matching the unused computer time at Southwestern Life Insurance Company with the computing needs of rapidly expanding Collins Radio, both located in Dallas, Texas.  Perot knew the inside details of both companies.

In its early years, EDS was a pioneer in facilities management – becoming the IT department for many companies – as well as beginning to service banks and provide early support for both Medicaid and Medicare in its home state of Texas. Leading the effort internally was Morton H. Meyerson, who joined the company in 1966 as the company's 54th employee. In 1967, he proposed the business model that eventually became known as "outsourcing" and which led to exponential growth for EDS.

In the 1970s, EDS expanded initially into more insurance services and later credit unions, and by 1975 revenue topped $100 million and the company began bidding for work internationally. In 1978 EDS expanded into financial markets with the arrival of automated teller machines, electronic funds transfer and real-time point-of-sale terminals. Meyerson was named president in 1979, at which point EDS had revenue of $270 million, was free of debt, and had 8,000 employees.

In the 1980s, they expanded into travel services supporting payment services between travel agents and airlines represented by the Air Transport Association of America, and provided large scale contracts for the US military.

In 1984, the company was acquired by General Motors for $2.5 billion, with EDS becoming a wholly owned subsidiary of GM. Meyerson remained president and in 1985, the company had a presence in 21 countries with 40,000 employees. Meyerson retired in 1987. During his years of executive leadership, EDS revenue grew to $4 billion a year, and the company grew to 45,000 employees. By the end of the decade, revenue was $5 billion. 

In 1996, GM spun off EDS as an independent company.

In the 1990s, in addition to its existing markets, EDS was entering the telecommunications industry and was providing IT systems in many foreign countries. They were providing information systems for global sporting events including the 1992 Barcelona Olympics, the 1994 FIFA World Cup, and the 1998 FIFA World Cup. In 1994, they signed what was at the time the largest information technology contract with Xerox for $3.2 billion and also bought the New Zealand banking processing company Databank Systems. In 1995 they purchased A.T. Kearney, the world's 4th largest private management consulting firm. In 1996, they became an independent company again and relisted on the New York Stock Exchange. Before the turn of the century they took part in over 1,300 Year 2000 projects.  As a part of the move towards being an independent company, EDS asked its employees to assist in the re-branding effort by submitting designs for a new logo.  While a design (a square with the "E" in it) was selected  and used for several years, it was the design of Shawn Downs, an employee in the Charlotte IPC, that was ultimately selected and utilized in the 2000 launch.

In 2000, EDS launched a new logo with an award-winning Super Bowl commercial about herding cats. Post-2000, they continued to sign long term, billion dollar contracts with organizations such as Bank of America, American Airlines, General Motors, Kraft Foods and the United States Navy. In 2006 they sold A.T. Kearney in a management buyout.

In May 2008, Hewlett-Packard Co. confirmed that it had reached a deal with EDS to acquire the company for $13.9 billion. The deal was completed on August 26, 2008. EDS became an HP business unit and was temporarily renamed "EDS, an HP company". Ronald A. Rittenmeyer, EDS Chairman, President, and CEO, remained at the helm and reported to HP CEO Mark Hurd until his retirement. In December 2008, HP announced that Rittenmeyer would retire at the end of the month.

As of 2008, EDS employed 300,000 people in 64 countries, the largest locations being the United States, India and the UK. It was ranked as one of the largest service companies on the Fortune 500 list with around 2,000 clients.

In September 2009, EDS began going to market as HP Enterprise Services, a name change which came one year after HP announced the acquisition of EDS, and which was a critical milestone as the integration of EDS into HP neared completion.

On April 3, 2017, Hewlett Packard Enterprise Services merged with Computer Sciences Corporation to form DXC Technology, retaining significant operations from Plano, Texas, and many aspects of EDS. On June 1, 2018, DXC spun off the U.S. public services sector of the business through a Reverse Morris Trust, combining with Vencore and KeyPoint Government Solutions to create a new independent and publicly traded government contractor, Perspecta Inc.

Company structure  

In 2006, EDS sold their management consulting subsidiary company, A.T. Kearney, in a management buyout and retained interests in five related companies:

 ExcellerateHRO, which offers human resources outsourcing services jointly owned by Towers Perrin
 Injazat Data Systems, which was a joint venture between EDS and Mubadala Development Company of Abu Dhabi. Its purpose is to provide IT and business process outsourcing (BPO) services in the United Arab Emirates, Qatar and Oman to the government, oil and gas, utilities, financial services, transportation, telecom and healthcare sectors
 SOLCORP, which provided software and consulting services for the life insurance and wealth management industry
 EDS Consumer Loan Services (Wendover), which supports consumer loans in the United States
MphasiS, operating from Bangalore, India, is an applications development and business processing and infrastructure outsourcing company. MphasiS was merged with then EDS India Unit to become MphasiS, an HP Company with about 33,000 employees. MphasiS operated as an independent  subsidiary with its own board and was listed on Indian markets as MphasiS Limited.

Acquisitions 
In June 2006, EDS acquired a majority holding in MphasiS, a leading applications and business process outsourcing (BPO) services company based in Bangalore, India.

In March 2007, EDS acquired RelQ Ltd, a testing company based in Bangalore, India.

In November 2007, EDS announced that it had agreed to purchase an approximate 93 percent equity interest in Sabre Corporation, a leading provider of software and services to U.S. state governments, from various sellers, including majority shareholder Accel-KKR, for approximately $420 million in cash. Saber became Saber Government Solutions after merging with other EDS state and local non-healthcare groups. In January 2009, it rebranded as EDS, an HP company.

In April 2008, EDS acquired Vistorm Holdings Limited, a provider of information assurance and managed security services based in the U.K. The acquisition will create one of the largest information assurance and managed security services firms in Europe.

In May 2008, HP and EDS announced that they had signed a definitive agreement under which HP would purchase EDS at a price of $25.00 per share, or an enterprise value of approximately $13.9 billion. The terms of the transaction were unanimously approved by the HP and EDS boards of directors. The transaction closed on 26 August 2008. The companies' collective services businesses, as of the end of each company's 2007 fiscal year, had annual revenues of more than $38 billion and 210,000 employees, doing business in more than 80 countries.

In September 2009, HP purchased Lecroix Systems and incorporated it into the infrastructure of EDS to facilitate both in-house and client network security needs.

Revenue sources  

For 2006, $9.6 billion of revenue came from the Americas (Canada, Latin America, and the United States); $6.4 billion from Europe, Middle East, and Africa; $1.5 billion from Asia-Pacific; Services' revenue was: Infrastructure $12 billion, Applications Software $5.9 billion, Business Process Outsourcing $3 billion and all other $421 million.

EDS announced the expansion of its SAP consulting practice:

By collaborating with SAP on client engagement training and techniques that will drive the long-term growth of its consulting practice, EDS will further enhance its existing SAP capabilities and bring end-to-end SAP consulting and systems integration to the market by early 2008. Additionally, EDS will work closely with SAP's Global Partner and Ecosystem Group for market penetration and value-added customer offerings.

Locations  

EDS operated in 66 countries, with the largest numbers of employees in the cities of Detroit, Michigan, USA; Dallas-Fort Worth, Texas, USA; São Paulo, Brazil; Washington, D.C., USA; Toronto, Ontario, Canada; Rome and Milan, Italy; Paris, France; Adelaide, Australia; Philadelphia, Pennsylvania, USA; Sydney, Australia; Blackpool, UK; Sacramento, California, USA; Tyneside, UK; Madrid and Barcelona, Spain, Antwerp, Belgium and Frankfurt, Germany. Other major facilities were in Argentina, Australia, Belgium, Brazil, Canada, Egypt, Germany, Hungary, India, Dublin, Ireland, Israel, Italy, Mexico, Netherlands, New Zealand, South Africa, Spain and the United Kingdom.

EDS's Plano, Texas campus is located about 20 miles (30 km) north of downtown Dallas. The campus consists of 3,521,000 square feet (327,000 m²) of office and data center space on 270 acres (1.1 km²) of land. The campus included four Tier-IV data centers, a command center, four clusters of office buildings, a fitness center, a service station, four helipads and a hangar. It is the center of the 2,665 acre (11 km²) Legacy in Plano real estate development, which EDS built.

Sponsorships  
EDS sponsored the Premier League association football team Derby County from 1998 to 2001 and was also a second-tier sponsor at the FIFA World Cups in the U.S.A. 1994 and France 1998.

EDS was the title sponsor of the PGA Tour's EDS Byron Nelson Championship from 2003 to 2008, played in nearby Irving, Texas. In 2009, it became the HP Byron Nelson Championship. The tournament raises about $6 million each year for youth and family service centers in Dallas, Texas.

EDS signed a sponsorship agreement in 2007 with Nobel Media to become a Global Sponsor of the Nobel Prize Series, and with Nobel Web to become its Global Technology Services Partner. The three-year agreement enables EDS to apply its technology expertise for the benefit of the Nobel Prize Series and the organization's Web technologies, including supporting the development of content on nobelprize.org, Nobel's award-winning website.

EDS sponsored Formula One team Jaguar Racing and was title sponsor of the 1995 Australian Grand Prix.

Services  

EDS cataloged its services into three service portfolios; Infrastructure, Applications, and Business Process Outsourcing. Infrastructure services includes maintaining the operation of part or all of a client's computer and communications infrastructure, such as networks, mainframes, "midrange" and Web servers, desktops and Laptops, and printers. Applications services involves the developing, integrating, and/or maintaining of applications software for clients. Business process outsourcing includes performing a business function for a client, like payroll, call centers, insurance claims processing, and so forth.

Partners  

EDS established a number of Business alliances with other companies through its global alliance program. The company has three types of alliances: Agility Alliances, Solution Alliances, and Technology Alliances.

The EDS Agility Alliance has worked on a range of projects, notably its Agile Enterprise. Members of the EDS Agility Alliance include Cisco Systems, EMC Corporation, Microsoft, Oracle Corporation, SAP, Sun Microsystems, Symantec, and Xerox.

Major clients  

Most of EDS's clients were very large companies and governments that need services from a company of EDS's scale. EDS's largest clients included Rolls-Royce plc, General Motors, Bank of America, Arcandor, Kraft, United States Navy, the UK Ministry of Defence and Royal Dutch Shell although General Motors announced plans to move 90% of its IT work back in house over the next 3 to 5 years starting in 2012.

EDS formed the National Heritage Insurance Company in 1996. The creation of this subsidiary is to manage Medicare Part B services on behalf of the Centers for Medicare and Medicaid Services (CMS), formerly the Health Care Financing Administration (HCFA). NHIC handles call center, claims processing and payment, fraud investigations, physician enrollment etc. in many states of the US.

Another large EDS client is the United States Navy. In 2000, they won a contract for the creation of a US$9 billion Intranet linking the Navy and the Marine Corps, which was set to late 2006, but on March 24, 2006, was extended to 2010, adding $3 billion to the accumulated contract worth. This initiative is known as the Navy Marine Corps Intranet, or simply NMCI. In 2004, NMCI accounted for about 4% of EDS's revenue. NMCI has been called the largest private network in the world, with approximately 400,000 "seats". EDS provided the network, desktops, laptops, servers, telephones, video-conferencing, satellite transceivers, and overall management of the intranet.

Following on to the NMCI type of services, EDS in March 2005 won a US$4 billion contract with the UK Ministry of Defence to "consolidate numerous existing information networks into a single next-generation infrastructure ... The network will provide seamless interaction between headquarters, battlefield support and the front line, linking about 150,000 desktop terminals and 340,000 users in approximately 2,000 locations ..."

In February 2008 EDS signed a US$1.3 billion contract with the Infocomm Development Authority of Singapore, one of the largest IT projects ever undertaken in Asia. This agreement will help the Singapore government achieve a standard desktop, network and messaging/collaboration environment across its public sector by the end of fiscal year 2010.

In October 2008, the U.S. Defense Information Systems Agency (DISA) signed a US$111 million contract with EDS. Under this contract, EDS will: conduct worldwide security reviews, deliver certification and accreditation support, provide independent evaluation of United States Department of Defense security policies, and conduct security assessments on DOD operating systems, applications, databases, and networks. DOD and EDS have had a 13-year relationship of providing DISA with a wide range of infrastructure services, hardware and software through the DISA I-Assure and Encore contract vehicles.

Of historical significance, just prior to the overthrow of the Shah of Iran, EDS was the IT company that developed the Iranian social security information system. During the 1979 overthrow, several EDS employees were detained by the transitioning government of Iran, causing H. Ross Perot to undertake extraordinary clandestine measures to get these employees out of Iran. These events were recounted in Ken Follett's book On Wings of Eagles.

Client contract controversies  
 In December 2003, EDS lost a 10-year £3 billion contract to run Inland Revenue IT services after a series of serious delays in the payment of tax credits, the contract instead being awarded to the company Capgemini. EDS had operated systems for the Inland Revenue since 1994 but the performance of its system had been low, causing late arrival of tax credit payments for hundreds of thousands of people.
 In 2004, EDS was criticized by the UK's National Audit Office for its work on IT systems for the UK's Child Support Agency (CSA), which ran seriously over budget causing problems which led to the resignation of the CSA's head, Doug Smith on 2004-11-27. The system's rollout had been two years late and following its introduction in March 2003 the CSA was obliged to write off £1 billion in claims, while £750 million in child support payments from absent parents remained uncollected. An internal EDS memo was leaked that admitted that the CSA's system was "badly designed, badly tested and badly implemented". UK MPs described it as an "appalling waste of public money" and called for it to be scrapped.
 In 2006, EDS' Joint Personnel Administration (JPA) system for the RAF led to thousands of personnel not receiving correct pay due to "processing errors". EDS and MoD staff were reported to have "no definitive explanations for the errors".
 In September 2007 EDS paid $500,000 to settle an action by the U.S. Securities and Exchange Commission regarding charges related to overstatement of its contract revenues in 2001–2003. At the time these caused a fall in share prices in 2002 which led to legal action against EDS from US shareholder groups.
 On 2007-10-16, British TV company BSkyB claimed £709m compensation from EDS, claiming that EDS' failure to meet its agreed service standards resulted not just from incompetence, but from fraud and deceit in the way it pitched for the contract.
 During the BSkyB case, it was shown that a Managing Director had obtained a degree over the Internet. Lawyers for Sky were able to demonstrate that the process for awarding the degree claimed would give a degree to a dog, and that the mark attained by the dog was higher than that of the HP executive, who was questioned on his expertise and integrity. HP lost the case with a preliminary £200 million payment ordered, whilst they appeal over the £700 million total.
 On 2008-10-10 it was reported that a Ministry of Defence hard drive potentially containing the details of 100,000 Armed Forces personnel could not be located by EDS.

See also 
In 1997 EDS signed its largest IT contract to that date, with the Commonwealth Bank of Australia for US$3.7 billion (approx AU$5bn at the prevailing exchange rate).

References

External links 
 "Electronic Data Systems" entry in the Handbook of Texas Online, published by the Texas State Historical Association

Business services companies of the United States
Companies based in Plano, Texas
Companies formerly listed on the London Stock Exchange
Former General Motors subsidiaries
Hewlett-Packard acquisitions
International information technology consulting firms
Online companies of the United States
Multinational companies headquartered in the United States
Ross Perot
Technology companies established in 1962
2008 mergers and acquisitions
Defunct software companies of the United States